Weymouth Landing/East Braintree station (signed as East Braintree/Weymouth Landing) is an MBTA Commuter Rail station on the border of Braintree and Weymouth, Massachusetts. It serves the Greenbush Line. It is located in Weymouth Landing, and consists of a single side platform serving the line's one track. The station is fully accessible.

History

The New Haven Railroad abandoned its remaining Old Colony Division lines on June 30, 1959, after the completion of the Southeast Expressway. The Weymouth station had been located just west of Commercial Street.

The MBTA reopened the Greenbush Line on October 31, 2007, with Weymouth station located between Commercial Street and Quincy Avenue. Original plans called for a  platform between the streets, but the MBTA ultimately decided to build a standard  platform that extends under the streets at either end.

References

External links

MBTA - Weymouth Landing/East Braintree
Station from Google Maps Street View

Stations along Old Colony Railroad lines
Railway stations in the United States opened in 2007
MBTA Commuter Rail stations in Norfolk County, Massachusetts
2007 establishments in Massachusetts